MotorTrend is an American automobile magazine. It first appeared in September 1949, and designated the first Car of the Year, also in 1949.

Petersen Publishing Company in Los Angeles published MotorTrend until 1998, when it was sold to British publisher EMAP, who then sold the former Petersen magazines to Primedia in 2001. MotorTrend bears the tagline "The Magazine for a Motoring World". As of 2019 it is published by Motor Trend Group. It has a monthly circulation of over one million.

Contents and sections
The contents of MotorTrend magazines are divided up into sections, or departments.

Road tests
MotorTrend magazine provides its readers with written "road tests" of vehicles. These road tests are published monthly, and are meant to give readers information about the featured vehicle, certain aspects of the vehicle, and what the readers can expect if the featured vehicle is purchased.

Vehicle comparisons
There are two main types of MotorTrend vehicle comparisons. Regular comparisons usually compare two to three vehicles, looking at what each is like to own, drive, etc. On MotorTrend's YouTube channel (titled "MotorTrend Channel"), MotorTrend puts up their best comparison of the month on a series called "Head 2 Head," featuring MotorTrend editors comparing cars on YouTube. "Big Test" comparisons typically feature anywhere from five to seven vehicles, all being compared against each other. In a way, a vehicle comparison is like a large road test featuring many vehicles, rather than just one.

The Trend
The Trend provides readers with the latest what's happening in the automotive industry. This section may feature news about manufacturers, recalls, etc. "Newcomers" (recently redesigned or all-new models), along with short informative articles about them, can also be found in this section.

MotorTrend Garage
MotorTrend keeps a fleet of long-term test cars at their headquarters in Los Angeles, California. The majority of the MotorTrend editors are each assigned a car, and their duty is to drive that car on a daily basis and report on what's happening. Each month, one to two new vehicles are added to the fleet, to replace the one to two vehicles leaving the fleet. Each long-term test lasts approximately one calendar year. Not every vehicle receives a printed update each month, though the vehicles are still there. This section is typically located towards the end of the magazine.

Other features
Other types of articles are sometimes featured in the MotorTrend magazine. There is typically one special feature per month. For example, in one issue of the magazine, there may be a special feature about MotorTrends "Real MPG" testing. For these tests, MotorTrend measures the "real-world" fuel economy of a vehicle in a number of conditions, and then compares their results to the EPA estimated fuel economy that manufacturers provide dealerships, who then provide it to their customers.

Motor Trend Car of the Year

One of the earliest and most enduring of the magazine's creations was its Car of the Year award, given almost continuously since 1949, although the phrase itself would not become entrenched until well into the 1950s. It predates the European Car of the Year award begun in 1964.

The first winner was the 1949 Cadillac, which featured an innovative overhead valve V8 engine; while the company initially turned down the award from the brand new magazine, it now proudly references its COTY wins in publicity materials. The award has gone through several splits and permutations over the years, being called the Golden Wheels Award for a while in the 1970s and having given rise to Truck of the Year and Import Car of the Year, as well as SUV of the Year. Nevertheless, it is still coveted by manufacturers and is usually covered by the mainstream press as the most important distinction awarded in the American auto industry.

New car guides
The magazine releases a special edition every September and October listing the latest new 
vehicles. The September issue looks at the latest cars (sedans, coupes, etc.) for the next coming calendar year, whilst in October the magazine looks at off-roaders, MPVs and sport-utility vehicles (SUVs).

Offshoots

Truck Trend
Truck Trend magazine presented features and the latest news about the truck, SUV, and crossover segments.  Additionally, the  Readers' Rides section allowed readers to post images and information about their own vehicles. Truck Trend began in 1995 as "Truck Trends," a section of Motor Trend itself.  It became the stand-alone publication Truck Trend in 1997. Truck Trend magazine ceased production in December 2019, as one of the nineteen magazines that Motor Trend Group ceased publication during that month.

Motor Trend Classic
Motor Trend Classic, which took a break from publishing in the late 2000s, was restarted in 2010. It includes articles about significant classic cars from around the world made during the last 60 years. Publication was later suspended again, and as of 2014, Motor Trend Classic was no longer being published.

Motor Trend On Demand
Motor Trend On Demand is an online television service. It features television series from Motor Trend, Automobile Magazine, Hot Rod, Super Street and Four Wheeler, such as Roadkill. In 2015, TEN bought Torque.TV and integrated it into the service, adding coverage of motorsports competitions such as Blancpain GT Series, Pirelli World Challenge, Deutsche Tourenwagen Masters, V8 Supercars, British Touring Car Championship, TCR International Series, FIA European Formula 3 Championship, European Le Mans Series, Australasian Safari, Motoamerica, Endurance FIM World Championship, Motocross World Championship, AMA EnduroCross Championship, and FIM SuperEnduro World Championship.

Motor Trend Network 

In April 2018, following the acquisition of a majority stake in TEN by Discovery Communications, it was announced that its U.S. cable channel Velocity would rebrand as Motor Trend Network later in the year.

Italy

In Italy, the channel Motor Trend began broadcasting on April 29, 2018 at 6:00 am with the Car Crash TV in place of Focus, whose brand has meanwhile passed into the hands of Mediaset.

Used car warranty
In 2009, Motor Trend introduced a certified used car program, beginning with dealers in Atlanta, Georgia and Cincinnati, Ohio. As explained in their press release, the program is powered by EasyCare.

References

External links
Motor Trend Official website
Truck Trend home page

Motor Trend Group
Automobile magazines published in the United States
Monthly magazines published in the United States
Magazines established in 1949
Magazines published in Los Angeles
1949 establishments in California
Turner Sports